Isotelus is a genus of asaphid trilobites from the middle and upper Ordovician period, fairly common in the Northeastern United States, northwest Manitoba, southwestern Quebec and southeastern Ontario. One species, Isotelus rex, is currently the world's largest trilobite ever found as a complete fossil, and was probably exceeded in size only by Hungioides bohemicus, in which the specimens probably exceeding Isotelus rex in size are only known from partial remains.

Discovery and naming
 
A specimen of Isotelus rex, from Churchill, Manitoba, is the largest complete trilobite ever found.

A number of species have been described:
I. aktchokensis Weber, 1948
I. bradleyi Amati, 2014
I. copenhagenensis Ross, Jr. & Shaw 1972
I. frognoensis Owen, 1981
I. gigas Dekay, 1824
I. harrisi Raymond, 1905 (synonym I. platymarginatus Raymond, 1910)
I. iowensis Owen, 1852
I. kimmswickensis Bradley, 1930
I. maximus Locke, 1838
I. megistos Locke, 1842
I. parvirugosus Chatterton & Ludvigsen, 1976
I. skapaneidos Amati, 2014
I. susae Whitfield, 1882
I. violaensis Amati, 2014
I. walcotti Walcott, 1918 (synonym I. planus De Mott, 1963)

Many specimens have also been found in Ohio, where Isotelus maximus is the state fossil.

References

Asaphida genera
Bromide Formation
Extinct animals of North America
Ordovician trilobites
Paleozoic life of Manitoba
Paleozoic life of Nunavut
Paleozoic life of Ontario
Verulam Formation
Paleozoic life of Quebec
Paleozoic life of the Northwest Territories
Symbols of Ohio